Alexander Ahl Holmström (born 4 April 1999) is a Swedish footballer who plays for GAIS.

Career
Alexander Ahl-Holmström began his career in FC Gute and he had a season with the club's senior team in Division 2, before moving to Kalmar FF as a 17-year-old.

On 11 March 2019, Kalmar FF signed a cooperation agreement Oskarshamns AIK and Holmström alongside his teammate Adrian Edqvist was loaned out to the club on the same day until 30 November 2019. The deal also made it possible to play in both Kalmar's A team and U21 teams while playing for Oskarshamns AIK.

In January 2021, Ahl Holmström was signed by AFC Eskilstuna, where he signed a two-year contract with an option for another year.

On 3 February 2022, Ahl Holmström moved to Örgryte on a two-year contract. On 20 January 2023, he signed with GAIS.

References

External links
 
 
 

1999 births
Living people
Association football midfielders
Swedish footballers
Sweden youth international footballers
Allsvenskan players
Superettan players
Ettan Fotboll players
Kalmar FF players
Oskarshamns AIK players
AFC Eskilstuna players
Örgryte IS players
GAIS players